The canton of Le Hom (before 2021: Thury-Harcourt) is an administrative division of the Calvados department, northwestern France. Its borders were modified at the French canton reorganisation which came into effect in March 2015. Its seat is in Thury-Harcourt-le-Hom.

Composition

It consists of the following communes:

Barbery
Le Bô
Boulon
Bretteville-le-Rabet
Bretteville-sur-Laize
Le Bû-sur-Rouvres
Cauvicourt
Cauville
Cesny-les-Sources
Cintheaux
Clécy
Combray
Cossesseville
Croisilles
Culey-le-Patry
Donnay
Espins
Esson
Estrées-la-Campagne
Fresney-le-Puceux
Fresney-le-Vieux
Gouvix
Grainville-Langannerie
Grimbosq
Martainville
Meslay
Montillières-sur-Orne
Moulines
Les Moutiers-en-Cinglais
Mutrécy
Ouffières
La Pommeraye
Saint-Germain-le-Vasson
Saint-Lambert
Saint-Laurent-de-Condel
Saint-Omer
Saint-Rémy
Saint-Sylvain
Soignolles
Thury-Harcourt-le-Hom
Urville
Le Vey

Councillors

Pictures of the canton

References

Cantons of Calvados (department)